Umbilicaria crustulosa, the crusty navel lichen, is a lichen of the genus Umbilicaria  in the family Umbilicariaceae.

Distribution
This species is present in Arctic, Europe, temperate and tropical Asia, Africa and North America. It grows on rocks.

References

crustulosa
Lichen species
Taxa named by Erik Acharius
Lichens described in 1810
Lichens of Africa
Lichens of Asia
Lichens of Europe
Lichens of North America
Lichens of the Arctic